Ernakulam, ; ISO: Eṟaṇākuḷaṁ, in Malayalam: എറണാകുളം), is one of the 14 districts in the Indian state of Kerala, that takes its name from the eponymous city division in Kochi. Its headquarters are located at Kakkanad. The district includes Kochi, also known as the commercial capital of Kerala, which is famous for its ancient Churches, Hindu temples, synagogues and mosques. The district includes the largest metropolitan region of the state: Greater Cochin. Ernakulam is the district that yields the most revenue and the largest number of industries in the state. Ernakulam is the third most populous district in Kerala, after Malappuram and Thiruvananthapuram (out of 14 districts). The district also hosts the highest number of international and domestic tourists in Kerala state.

The most commonly spoken language in Ernakulam is Malayalam. English is widely used, mostly in business circles. Ernakulam became India's first district to have 100 percent banking or full "meaningful financial inclusion" in 2012.

Ernakulam has a high Human Development Index of 0.801 (UNHDP report 2005), which is one of the highest in India.

History

Ernakulam has played a part in the political history of south India since ancient times. The Jews, Syrians, Arabs, Chinese, Dutch, British, and Portuguese seafarers followed the sea route to the Kingdom of Cochin and left their impressions on the town. The port at Kozhikode held superior economic and political position in medieval Kerala coast, while Kannur, Kollam, and Kochi, were commercially important secondary ports, where the traders from various parts of the world would gather. In 1664, the municipality of Fort Kochi was established by Dutch Malabar, making it the first municipality in Indian subcontinent, which got dissolved when the Dutch authority got weaker in 18th century. In 1896, the Maharaja of Cochin initiated local administration by forming a town council in Ernakulam. Initially, The district's headquarters were located in the portion of the city known as Ernakulam, which gave the district its name; the headquarters was relocated afterwards to Kakkanad.

In the year 1998, Kuttampuzha village was added to the district from Idukki district following which the district got a political boundary with neighbouring state of Tamil Nadu. There is no interstate road that connects the district with the neighbouring state through this border.

Geography

It is surrounded by the Thrissur District to the north, the Idukki District to the east, Alappuzha and Kottayam districts to the south and the Laccadive Sea to the west. The Anamalais occupy a large part of the district, consisting of the forest areas around Pooyamkutty and the Idamalayar Dam. The range also extends into Thrissur, Palakkad, and Idukki districts, as well as Coimbatore and Tiruppur districts of Tamil Nadu. The district is divided geographically into highland, midland, and coastal area. The Periyar River, Kerala's longest, flows through all the taluks except Muvattupuzha. The Muvattupuzha River and a branch of the Chalakkudy River also flow through the district. The district has a moderate climate and mostly falls within the Malabar Coast moist forests ecoregion, while the highlands are part of the South Western Ghats moist deciduous forests ecoregion. The Anamudi is the tallest peak in South India, on the border of Ernakulam and Idukki districts. Some parts of the Idamalayar Reserve Forest and Mankulam Forest Division have Sholas but these parts are inaccessible by road. The Idamalayar Reserve Forest, and Edamalakkudy. Many types of sand, soil, and rocks are abundant here. Cochin International Airport is located in the northern part of the district at Nedumbassery, Kochi.

The district houses two Urban Agglomerations, Kochi and Kothamangalam. Kochi is the largest city in the state, and 17th most populous in the country according to the Ministry of Housing and Urban Affairs rankings based on the 2011 Census, with an area of over 843km2 and 2.12 million population.

Topography

The district is divided into three parts: lowland, midland, and the highland that consist of seaboard, plains, and hills and forests respectively. 20 percent of the total area are lowlands. The forests in the eastern part of the district are mostly remote, forming a part of the Anamalais. The highest peak is the Anamudi. The midland consists mainly of plain land and a group of islands that naturally drain water via backwaters and canals. The hilly or eastern portion is formed by a section of the Western Ghats. Muvattupuzha and Kothamangalam taluks, which were initially parts of the Kottayam district and constitute the highlands. Muvattupuzhayar and Periyar are the main rivers, of which the latter flows through Muvattupuzha, Aluva, Kunnathunad and Parur taluks. During the rainy season these rivers are full and heavy floods affect the low-lying areas on the banks, but in the summer season, they generally go dry and narrow.

Forest and wildlife

The flora of this district is tropical. The heavy rainfall combined with moderate temperatures and fertile soil support abundant vegetation. Many of the common plants are found in the coastal area, which forms the lowland region. The midland region is occupied by coconut palms, paddy, tapioca, pepper, pineapple and pulses. The lower slopes of the highland region have teak and rubber.

Mangalavanam Bird Sanctuary 

Mangalavanam Bird Sanctuary is located at the centre of Kochi. The Managalavanam is called the "green lung of Kochi", considering its role in controlling the city's air pollution.

Thattekad Bird Sanctuary
It was founded by ornithologist Salim Ali. Birds found here include falcons, jungle fowl, water hens, and hornbills. The flora of this area consists mainly of plantations of teak, rosewood, and mahogany. Further on the road, Pooyamkutty forest of the Anamalais is reached.

Climate

Economy

Ernakulam district is the richest district in Kerala and is the biggest commercial centre in the state of Kerala. It contributes the most to the state exchequer in terms of GSVA and tax revenues. It has the highest literacy rate as well as the highest per capita income in the state, along with having the most number of commercialised banks, startups and large scale industries & MSMEs in the state. 
Its M.G. Road is home to some of Kerala's most prestigious enterprises. Kochi is also the headquarters of some large companies like Federal Bank, Geojit,  V-Guard, and Muthoot.

The sea along the entire coast of the district and its backwaters are the habitat of various kinds of fish that supply both marine and inland fisheries.

Agriculture

The eastern part of Ernakulam is primarily agrarian in nature. Rice is the principal crop cultivated in the wetlands. The district is the largest producer of nutmeg and pineapple in the state: more than 55% of pineapples produced in the state is cultivated in the district. Rubber is the most cultivated plantation crop in the district and the district is the second-largest producer of rubber in the state behind Kottayam. Other important crops cultivated in the district are tapioca, black pepper, areca nut, coconut, turmeric, banana, and plantain.

Education

Ernakulam is the first district in India to have 100 percent literacy by 1990. In fact Kochi has the highest literacy rate for any city in the country with over 20 lakhs population. Pothanikkad is the first village in India that achieved 100 percent literacy according to state literacy programme is in this district.

There are three prominent universities in Ernakulam: Sree Sankaracharya University of Sanskrit in Kalady, Cochin University of Science and Technology in Kalamassery, and Kerala University of Fisheries and Ocean Studies in Kochi. The district has the most number of educational institutions in the state; as of 2019, there are 476 fully high-tech schools in Ernakulam.

In 2017, Ernakulam district administration launched the Roshni project, which aims to provide Malayalam education to migrant children. It supported 1,265 migrant workers’ children from lower primary to high school.

Divisions

There are two revenue divisions: Fort Kochi and Muvattupuzha. The municipal corporation is in Kochi.

Taluks

The district has the most taluks in the state. The district is divided by two revenue divisions with seven taluks.

 Paravur
 Aluva
 Kunnathunad
 Muvattupuzha
 Kochi
 Kanayannur
 Kothamangalam

Municipalities

Interestingly, Ernakulam district has the most number of municipalities in the state.

 North Paravur
 Piravom
 Muvattupuzha
 Koothattukulam
 Perumbavoor
 Aluva
 Angamaly
 Thripunithura
 Kalamassery
 Kothamangalam
 Eloor
 Maradu
 Thrikkakara

A criticism that has been centered around this fact is that despite municipalities like Aluva, Kalamassery, Thrikkakara, Maradu, Tripunithura and Eloor becoming assimilated into Kochi city, they still exist as individual municipalities instead of being under Kochi Corporation. Surprisingly the corporation has not amended its limits for over half a century, since 1967 to be precise. The corporation was the largest in area and population when it was formed, and all these regions were panchayaths back then. Instead of adding them to the corporation when these regions started developing due to the urban expansion of Kochi city, they were made into separate municipalities thus largely handicapping the corporation. Now the call to expand these outdated limits for a better unified administration for the entire city of Kochi is a strong public demand.

Parliamentary Constituencies

 Ernakulam Parliamentary Constituency
 Chalakudy Parliamentary Constituency (partially)
 Idukki Parliamentary Constituency (parts of Muvattupuzha taluk and Kothamangalam taluk)
 Kottayam Parliamentary Constituency (parts of Muvattupuzha taluk and Kanayannur taluk)

Assembly Constituencies

Piravom
Angamaly
Aluva
Kalamassery
North Paravur
Vypeen
Kochi
Ernakulam
Thrikkakara
Thripunithura
Perumbavoor
Kunnathunad
Moovattupuzha
Kothamangalam

Demographics

According to the 2018 Statistics Report, Ernakulam has a population of 3,427,659. The 2011 Census of India reports that the district is ranked 104th most populous in India out of 640. Its population growth rate in 2001–2011 was 5.69%. Ernakulam has a sex ratio of 1027 females for every 1000 males, and a literacy rate of 95.89%. Scheduled Castes and Scheduled Tribes make up 8.18% and 0.50% of the population respectively.

Malayalam is the predominant language, spoken by 96.70% of the population. Other languages spoken in Kochi include Tamil (the second-most spoken language) and Punjabi.

This district is listed as the "most advanced" district in Kerala. It had a resident population of 3,105,798 as of 2001, excluding the commuters from neighbouring districts. The urban population is 68%.

According to the 2011 Census of India, Ernakulam District also houses the largest city (UA) in the state (17th largest in the country) - Kochi Urban Agglomeration. Kochi UA spans across 843km2 with a population of 2,119,724 (2.12 million), thereby housing approximately two thirds of the population of Ernakulam District. Government of Kerala have also marked Kochi UA as the only "first order UA" in the state, which has its influence spread across the entire state unlike the other smaller cities.

The district also houses another smaller urban agglomeration - Kothamangalam, which has an area of 81.42 km2 housing over 1,14, 639 people. The towns of Kothamangalam and Muvattupuzha form a major chunk of the Kothamangalam UA.

Religion

Hindus (46%) accounts for the largest community, followed by Christians (38%) (Latin Catholic, Syro-Malabar, Jacobites, Pentecostals and Malankara Orthodox) and Muslims (15.7%). A small population of Jains, Jews, and Sikhs reside in Kochi. Ernakulam once had a vibrant Jewish population, with several synagogues, known as the Malabar Jews who used to dominate the trade and commercial activities in the district. After the state of Israel was formed in 1945, the entire community made aliyah to Israel in the 1950's. Today they number 8000 in Israel but very few Jews remain in the district. After a direct flight service was established between Kochi and Tel Aviv they have retained ties with the state with annual visits and gatherings.

Ernakulam also has a significant Konkani Hindu population who migrated from Goa during the Goa Inquisition. There is a small Jain community in Ernakulam district, concentrated mainly in Kochi city. The Sikh community in Ernakulam is also concentrated mainly in Kochi. There are more than 25 Sikh families in Kochi and there is one gurdwara.

Culture

Festivals and traditions

The Aluva Sivarathri festival at the Aluva Mahadeva Temple (situated on the banks of river Periyar) in Aluva attracts people from around the country.

St. Mary's Orthodox Syrian Cathedral, Piravom is believed to be founded in 405 A.D. and was the headquarters of Archdeacon and St Thomas until the 18th century.

Adi Shankaracharya was born in Kalady, which is considered to be a major pilgrimage centre for Hindus around the world.

Kallil Kshethram is a famous Jain temple near Perumbavoor.

Puthencruz is the regional seat of Syriac Orthodox Church in India, and is where Saint Thomas Syro-Malabar Catholic Church, Malayattoor is located.

The eight-day lent (Ettunombu) festival at St Mary's Jacobite Syrian Valiyapally, Thamarachal attracts many people from all over the state. St. George Orthodox Syrian Church at Kadamattam near Muvattupuzha is very old and was founded by Mar Abo Syrian Metropolitan in the 5th century A.D. He brought a cross from Persia, which is preserved in the church. The festival at the Latin church of Vallarpadam on 24 September attracts people belonging to all religions. The icon of Virgin Mary in this church is credited with many miracles. St. George's Syro-Malabar Catholic Forane Church, Edappally was founded in 593 A.D.

Important pilgrimage sites in Ernakulam are Koonan Kurish St George Orthodox Pilgrim church, Mattancherry; Vadakken Paravoor St Thomas Catholic Church, Malayattoor Pally; and Mor Thoman Jacobite Church, Kothamangalam; and Thrikkunnathu St Mary's Seminary Church, Aluva. The relics of Gregorios Abdul Jaleel are preserved at the St. Thomas Jacobite church North Paravur. Thousands of pilgrims from Kerala culminate on 27 April for the Dhukrono of the Saint. The Feast of Eldho Mor Baselios is celebrated in the tomb church Mor Thoman Church at Kothamangalam every year on 2 and 3 October. The Feast of Paulose Mar Athanasius on 26 January at Thrikkunnathu St Mary's Seminary Church, Aluva, where he is entombed, also attracts thousands.

Gheevarghese Mar Gregorios of Parumala, also known as Parumala Thirumeni, the first saint of Malankara Orthodox Syrian Church from India was born and brought up in Mulanthuruthy.

Places of interest

Marine Drive, Kochi
Kadavumbhagam Mattancherry Synagogue
Kadavumbhagam Ernakulam Synagogue
Paradesi Synagogue: Constructed in 1567, only active synagogue in the Kochi.
Chinese Fishing Nets (Cheena Vala)
Hill Palace, Tripunithura
Bolgatty Island
Willingdon Island
Dutch Palace: Made in 1568 by the Portuguese. Later re-structured by the Dutch.
St. Francis Church, Kochi: Originally built in 1503, the oldest European church in India
Kodanad: Elephant training centre is located here.
Pareekshit Thampuran Museum
Kerala Historical Museum: Located at Edappally
Chendamangalam, a village
 Palium Palace
Vypeenakotta Seminary
Bhoothathankettu, a scenic dam site
St. Thomas Syro-Malabar Catholic Church, Malayattoor: The only international shrine in Asia. Believed to have been visited by St. Thomas, the apostle.
Wonder La, Kakkanad: Amusement park
Cherai Beach.
Kuzhippilly Beach
Fort Kochi Beach
Paniyeli Poru
Ezhattumugham

Transport

Road connectivity
The three major national highways passing through Ernakulam are the Cochin-Mumbai Highway (NH 66), Salem-Kanyakumari (NH 47 part of NSEW corridor), and Cochin-Dhanushkodi highway (NH 49).

Railway station
Ernakulam has 17 railway stations. The Ernakulam Junction, Ernakulam Town and Aluva are the major stations. The other stations are Angamaly, Thripunithura, Edapally, Mulamthuruthy, Cochin Harbour Terminus, Karakutty, Chowara, Kalamassery, Nettoor, Kumbalam, Mattancherry H., Chottanikkara road, and Piravom road. The rail routes travel via Thrissur, Kottayam, Cochin H.T., Alappuzha, and Vallarpadam. The Angamaly-Erumely Sabarimala route passes through the district. Kochi Metro runs in Kochi.

Airport
Ernakulam district has two airports: Naval airport in W.island (Old Cochin airport) and Cochin International Airport (CIAL). CIAL is the fourth largest airport in the country after Mumbai, Delhi, and Chennai, and serves International passengers.

Water transport
Ernakulam lies in the flat delta region of the Periyar and Moovattupuzha rivers. Water transport is prominent in the district via rivers and lagoons.

Notable people
 
Hibi Eden (Present MP)
Adi Sankaracharya (Saint Advaita)
Abraham Barak Salem (Jewish Gandhi))
Ajay Kudua (cricketer)
Swami Chinmayananda (Indian spiritual leader and geetacharya )
Geevarghese Mar Gregorios of Parumala (Syrian Orthodox Saint)
Paulose Mar Athanasius (Syrian Orthodox Saint)
Shadkala Govinda Marar (Carnatic musician)
Sahodaran Ayyappan (social reformer and former minister of Kochi State)
K J Yesudas (singer)
Changampuzha (poet)
Malayattoor ramakrishnan (novelist) 
NS Madhavan (writer)
N. A. Naseer (photographer, activist and author)
Sebastian Paul (politician)
Simon Britto Rodrigues (politician) 
K J Maxi (Kochi MLA)
Feroze V Rasheed (cricketer)
K Jayaraman (cricketer)
G. Sankara Kurup (poet)
P K Vasudevan Nair (former chief minister)
Balachandran Chullikad (poet and actor)
Sreesanth (cricketer)
K. V. Thomas (politician)
Asin Thottumkal (actress)
Jayasurya (actor)
Cochin Haneefa (actor)
Sreejesh Ravindran (hockey player)
Sankaradi (actor)
Salim Kumar (actor)
T. K. Narayana Pillai (former chief minister of Kerala)
Jayaram (actor)
Lalu Alex (actor)
Hibi Eden (politician)
K. M. George (politician)
Francis George (politician)
Johnny Nellore (politician)
T. M. Jacob (politician)
Anoop Jacob (politician)
Jose Thettayil (politician)
Nivin Pauly (actor)
Lal (actor)
Rajeev Ravi (director and cinematographer)
 Subi Suresh (actress and comedian)

Gallery

See also
Arayankavu
Edathala
Kizhakkambalam
Kizhakkumbhagom
Malayattoor
Perumpalloor
Thuthiyoor

References

Further reading

External links

 
1958 establishments in Kerala
Districts of Kerala